HD 80230 is a single star in the southern constellation of Carina, near the northern constellation border with Vela. It has the Bayer designation g Carinae, while HD 80230 is the star's identifier in the Henry Draper catalogue. This is a suspected variable star with a brightness that has been measured varying from magnitude 4.31 down to 4.35, both of which is bright enough for the star to be visible to the naked eye. The distance to this object is approximately 490 light years based on parallax, but it is drifting closer to the Sun with a radial velocity of −5 km/s.

This object is an aging red giant, currently on the asymptotic giant branch, with a stellar classification of M0.5IIIa. It is a mild barium star, showing trace enhancement of s-process elements in its spectrum. The star has 2.2 times the mass of the Sun and has expanded to 75 times the Sun's radius. It is radiating 1,172 times the luminosity of the Sun from its enlarged photosphere at an effective temperature of 3,904 K.

References 

M-type giants
Asymptotic-giant-branch stars
Barium stars
Suspected variables

Carina (constellation)
Carinae, g
Durchmusterung objects
080230
045496
3696